Šípkové is a village and municipality in Piešťany District in the Trnava Region of western Slovakia.

History
In historical records the village was first mentioned in 1269.

Geography
The municipality lies at an altitude of 230 metres and covers an area of 8.301 km². It has a population of about 337 people.

References

External links
http://www.statistics.sk/mosmis/eng/run.html

Villages and municipalities in Piešťany District